War of Aggression is the fourth full-length studio album by the Canadian groove metal band A Perfect Murder, released together with the two of their extended plays.

Track listing 

War of Aggression
Enemy of Mine
Label Me
Within
In Hell
Rapture
Disconnect
Sadist
Fortunate Son
Legion of Doom

Personnel 

 Kevin Randel – vocals
 Carl Bouchard – lead guitar
 Kyrill Ducharme – rhythm guitar
 Francois Michel Labrie – bass
 Yan Chausse – drums

References

External links 
War of Aggression at blogcritics.com

2007 albums
A Perfect Murder (band) albums
Concept albums
2009 albums